Heather Olver (born 15 March 1986) is an English badminton player. Her career highlights so far include mixed team and mixed doubles silver at the 2014 Commonwealth Games, European women’s doubles bronze, and reaching the final of the 2013 London Grand Prix Gold and Scottish Open. She also competed at the 2016 Rio Summer Olympics.

Early career
She started playing at the age of six and started when she joined her local club, Waldron Junior BC, with her brother.

Career
In 2005, Olver won the women's doubles at both the England Junior Championships and the Welsh International. In 2009, she was successful four times internationally, and in the following year she won the bronze medal at the European Championships in women's doubles.

She competed in the mixed team and mixed doubles event at the 2014 Commonwealth Games where she won silver medals respectively. She also won mixed team bronze in 2010.

Education
Having attended primary school at Cross in Hand CEP, she later went on to obtain a degree in Coach Education and Sports Development from the University of Bath. She was both a triple jumper and a 200m sprinter at Heathfield Community College in East Sussex.

Achievements

Commonwealth Games 
Mixed Doubles

European Championships 
Women's Doubles

BWF Grand Prix 
The BWF Grand Prix has two level such as Grand Prix and Grand Prix Gold. It is a series of badminton tournaments, sanctioned by Badminton World Federation (BWF) since 2007.

Women's Doubles

Mixed Doubles

 BWF Grand Prix Gold tournament
 BWF Grand Prix tournament

BWF International Challenge/Series
Women's doubles

Mixed doubles

 BWF International Challenge tournament
 BWF International Series tournament

References

1986 births
Living people
Sportspeople from Eastbourne
Alumni of the University of Bath
English female badminton players
Olympic badminton players of Great Britain
Badminton players at the 2016 Summer Olympics
Badminton players at the 2010 Commonwealth Games
Badminton players at the 2014 Commonwealth Games
Commonwealth Games medallists in badminton
Commonwealth Games silver medallists for England
Commonwealth Games bronze medallists for England
People from Heathfield, East Sussex
Medallists at the 2010 Commonwealth Games
Medallists at the 2014 Commonwealth Games